Fleurever is the debut studio album by Canadian rapper Jazz Cartier. It was released on July 27, 2018, by Universal Music Canada. The deluxe edition was released on November 9, 2018.

Background
The album was announced back in December 2016. In an interview with Billboard about the album title, Cartier said that:

It comes from my nickname in French, which is fleur. Essentially, in my head, or in my world, it’s the flower that will live forever. It will just never die. It just has so much energy from everybody for years to come, and it’s my take on that.

In another interview with Billboard about the idea of duality on the album: Cartier said:

I just find that duality is a constant thing that everyone goes through. But I think more so myself because of like how I was raised and where I was raised and things I've been going through. Even with all the success and everything happening like you know what a lot of shit changes in your life and people talk about cliches but cliches are cliches for a reason. You go through all of them and you just find yourself looking in the mirror and being like there's some things I have to adjust to make sure this thing doesn't happen again or just learning from certain mistakes and that's the constant struggle with me and duality.

Promotion

Singles
The album's lead single, "Tempted", was released for digital download on January 6, 2017. The music video was released on May 5, 2017. The song was produced by Lantz and T-Minus, with additional production by Sean Fischer and peaked at number 91 on the Canadian Hot 100 chart, becoming his highest charting single.

The album's second single, "Right Now" featuring KTOE, was released on April 6, 2018, alone with an accompanied music video six days later.

The album's third single, "Godflower", was released for digital download on May 18, 2018, alone with an accompanied music video six days later.

"Which One" was released on June 22, 2018, as the album's fourth single. The music video was released on July 6, 2018.

Other songs
The music video for "Cuzzi Relax", was released on March 18, 2019. The music video was directed by Brilliant Garcia.

Critical reception

Fleurever received generally positive reviews from critics. Riley Wallace of Exclaim! praised the album, writing: "He's in a whole different mind state, and it comes across in the eclectic, yet remarkably cohesive track list. The "something to prove" chip on his shoulder seems to have been replaced with thoughtful reflection and developed songwriting." Scott Glaysher of HipHopDX said, "As impressive as Fleurever’s introspection is, the album isn’t all just rhymes from his deep dark diary. There are plenty of turn-up moments that bode strong production and even stronger songwriting." Kevin Ritchie of Now said, "Fleurever is the MC’s most cohesive album to date: it’s all about hooky flows and hard, trap drums tuned for maximal impact on club systems, but undercut by streaks of melodic melancholy."

Track listing 
Credits were adapted from Tidal.

Notes
 All tracks stylized in all caps, with a bullet in front of each tracks. For example, "Soul Searcher" is stylized as "• SOUL SEARCHER".

Sample credits
 "IDWFIL" contains a sample of "Tyrant", written and performed by Kali Uchis and Jorja Smith.

Charts

References

2018 debut albums
Albums produced by T-Minus (record producer)
Albums produced by WondaGurl
Jazz Cartier albums